Hanna Slipenko (born 22 November 1973) is a Ukrainian cross-country skier. She competed in the women's 30 kilometre freestyle event at the 1998 Winter Olympics.

References

External links
 

1973 births
Living people
Ukrainian female cross-country skiers
Olympic cross-country skiers of Ukraine
Cross-country skiers at the 1998 Winter Olympics
People from Severodvinsk